Blood, Sweat & Heels is an American reality television series that premiered on January 5, 2014, on Bravo. It depicts the personal, professional, and social circle of several women who all reside in New York City.

The premiere episode of Blood, Sweat and Heels ranked as a network best for a series premiere on Bravo at that time, averaging 2.5 million viewers and 1.4 million in the adults 18-49 viewership demo. The cast of the first season included Melyssa Ford, Demetria Lucas, Brie Bythewood, Mica Hughes, Daisy Lewellyn, and Geneva S. Thomas. The season concluded on March 23, 2014, with a 90-minute reunion show. Brie Bythewood was dismissed from the series after the first season, and was replaced by two newcomers, Chantelle Fraser and Arzo Anwar.

In April 2014, Bravo renewed Blood, Sweat and Heels for a second season, which premiered on March 29, 2015.

On April 8, 2016, series star Daisy Lewellyn died after battling bile duct cancer. She was 36. She learned of the disease in 2015, after makeup artists noticed an unusual coloring in her eye. In the season two finale, she celebrated completing her radiation treatments.

Cast
 Melyssa Ford
 Demetria Lucas D'Oyley
 Mica Hughes
 Geneva S. Thomas
 Daisy Lewellyn
 Brie Bythewood (season 1)
 Chantelle Fraser (season 2)
 Arzo Anwar (season 2)

Episodes

Season 1 (2014)

Season 2 (2015)

References

External links 

 
 
 

2010s American reality television series
2014 American television series debuts
2015 American television series endings
English-language television shows
Bravo (American TV network) original programming
Television shows set in New York (state)
Women in New York City